Britta Becker (born 11 May 1973 in Rüsselsheim) is a German former field hockey midfield player.

Becker made her debut in the German women's field hockey team in 1991 and was the youngest in the Olympic squad in 1992. She was part of the 1995 winning team in the European Cup and the bronze medal-winning team in the 1998 World Cup. She retired in 2004, just before her team won the Olympic gold medal in Athens. She has four children, Emily Blooma (*1999), Nik David (*2001), Polly Marie (*2007) and Jilly Lina (*2009).

References

External links
 

1973 births
Living people
People from Rüsselsheim
Sportspeople from Darmstadt (region)
German female field hockey players
Field hockey players at the 1992 Summer Olympics
Field hockey players at the 1996 Summer Olympics
Field hockey players at the 2000 Summer Olympics
Olympic field hockey players of Germany
Olympic silver medalists for Germany
Olympic medalists in field hockey
Medalists at the 1992 Summer Olympics